U of P may refer to:

 Univerzita Palackého, a university in the Czech Republic
 University of Patras, a university in Greece
 The Pan-American University, a university in Mexico
 University of the Philippines, a university in the Philippines
 University of Porto, a university in the Portugal
 University of Pretoria, a university in South Africa
 University of Portland, a university in the United States
 University of Pennsylvania, a university in the United States
 University of Pittsburgh, a university in the United States

See also
 UP (disambiguation)